Jae-Doo Yuh (Hangul: 유제두, Hanja: 柳済斗) (born April 25, 1948, in Seoul, South Korea) is a former boxer from South Korea who held the Lineal and WBA Light middleweight titles.

Pro career
In 1971, Yuh won the Orient and Pacific Boxing Federation middleweight title.

In 1975, after his successful 15th defense of the OPBF middleweight title, he moved down in weight to light middleweight and challenged Koichi Wajima for the WBA and The Ring light middleweight titles in Fukuoka, Japan. He eventually became the second South Korean light middleweight world champion by knocking out Wajima in the 7th round. He defended the belt once before losing the belt to Wajima via 14th-round KO in a rematch in 1976. Although he had lost the world light middleweight title, Yuh retained the OPBF middleweight belt until his eventual retirement from the ring in 1978, when he vacated the title. He also holds the OPBF record for most successful title defenses, defending the title 21 times over 7 years.

Professional boxing record

See also
List of light middleweight boxing champions
List of WBA world champions

References

External links
 
Yuh Jae-doo - CBZ Profile

1948 births
Light-middleweight boxers
World Boxing Association champions
World light-middleweight boxing champions
Living people
South Korean male boxers